Stabilizer, stabiliser, stabilisation or stabilization may refer to:

Chemistry and food processing 
 Stabilizer (chemistry), a substance added to prevent unwanted change in state of another substance
 Polymer stabilizers are stabilizers used specifically is plastic or other polymers
 Stabilizer (food), a type of food additive
 Wood stabilization, a wood preservation process to prevent distortion caused by moisture
 Clarification and stabilization of wine

Mathematics
 Stabilization (category theory)
 Stabilizer subgroup

Technology 
 Buoyancy compensator (diving) adjusts buoyancy.
 Stabilizer (aircraft), surfaces to help keep aircraft under control. Includes:
 Vertical stabilizer of airplanes
 Tailplane or horizontal stabilizer
 Stabilizer (ship), fins on ships to counteract roll
 Stabiliser, another name for bicycle training wheels
 Stabilizers, the extendable legs mounted on a land vehicle which are folded out when stabilization is required; see Outrigger
 Drilling stabilizer, part of the bottom hole assembly in oil drilling
 Gyroscopic stabilizer (disambiguation), on ships and aircraft
 Gun stabilizer, or gyrostabilizer, a device that helps a moving tank's gunner to aim the gun
 Sway bar, a bar linking the two sides of an automotive suspension
 Stabilization pond, a way of stabilizing wastewater
 Voltage stabilizer, a system designed to automatically maintain a constant voltage

Photography
 Camera stabilizer, an external mechanical device to stabilize the camera as a whole
 Image stabilization, software or hardware that stabilizes the image

Other uses 
 Stabilization (architecture) of worn or damaged foundations of a structure
 Stabilization (medical) is a process to help prevent shock in sick or injured people
 Stabilization (warfare), part of counter-insurgency operations
 Automatic stabilizer, an economics term
 Crude oil stabilisation, part of an oil production plant
 Mood stabilizer, a kind of psychiatric medication
 Segmental stabilizers are the muscles which provide support across joints
 Stabiliser cattle, a breed of beef cattle
 Stabilizer code, a concept in quantum error correction
 Stabilizers (band), am American band

See also
 Destabilisation
 Stability (disambiguation)